Karl Schlechta (28 January 1922 – 5 September 2016) was an Austrian football player and coach who played as a forward.

Death
Schlechta died on 5 September 2016, at the of 94.

References

External links
Austria Archiv 
Sturm Archiv 
Rapid Archiv 

1922 births
2016 deaths
Austrian people of Czech descent
Austrian footballers
Footballers from Vienna
Association football forwards
SC Hakoah Wien footballers
Floridsdorfer AC players
Austrian football managers
FK Austria Wien managers
LASK managers
FC Red Bull Salzburg managers
SK Sturm Graz managers
SK Rapid Wien managers
Wiener Sport-Club managers